Johannes Gutmann (?-?) was an Estonian politician. He was a member of II Riigikogu. He was a member of the Riigikogu since 19 November 1923. He replaced Jaak Reichmann. On 5 October 1925, he resigned his position and he was replaced by Ernst Masik.

References

Year of birth missing
Place of birth missing
Year of death missing
Place of death missing
Farmers' Assemblies politicians
Members of the Riigikogu, 1923–1926